Škvořetice is a municipality and village in Strakonice District in the South Bohemian Region of the Czech Republic. It has about 300 inhabitants.

Administrative parts
The village of Pacelice is an administrative part of Škvořetice.

References

Villages in Strakonice District